Kessleria helvetica is a moth of the family Yponomeutidae. It is found in Switzerland.

The length of the forewings is 6.9–7 mm for males and 6.2-7.3 mm for females. The forewings are white with light and dark brown scales. The hindwings are light grey. Adults are on wing from the beginning of June to the end of August.

References

Moths described in 1992
Yponomeutidae